Ialomița County is a county of Romania, in Muntenia, with the capital city at Slobozia.

Demographics 
In 2011, the county had a population of 258,669 and the population density was 58.08/km2.

Romanians make up 95.6% of the population, the largest minority being the Romani people (4.1%).

Geography

The county is situated in the Bărăgan Plain. The area is flat crossed by small rivers with small but deep valleys.

Its eastern border is on the Danube. The Ialomița River crosses the county from West to East about the middle. The Danube is split around the Ialomița Pond into the Old Danube branch and the Borcea branch.

Until 1940 (in the western part) and 1967 (in the eastern part) the county/plain was home of the great bustard (dropie in Romanian), with large populations of this bird. The birds disappeared because of the massive village buildout and hunting them for food.

Neighbours

Constanța County in the East.
Ilfov County in the West.
Brăila County, Buzău County, and Prahova County in the North.
Călărași County in the South.

Economy
Agriculture is the main occupation in the county. Industry is almost entirely concentrated in the city of Slobozia.

The predominant industries in the county are:
 Food industry.
 Textile industry.
 Mechanical components industry.

Tourism

The main tourist destinations are:
 The city of Slobozia.

Politics 
The Ialomița County Council, renewed at the 2020 local elections, consists of 30 counsellors, with the following party composition:

Administrative divisions

Ialomița County has 3 municipalities, 4 towns and 59 communes.
Municipalities
Fetești - population: 27,122 (as of 2011)
Slobozia - capital city; population: 43,061 (as of 2011)
Urziceni - population: 14,053 (as of 2011)
Towns
Amara
Căzănești
Fierbinți-Târg
Țăndărei

Communes
Adâncata
Albești
Alexeni
Andrășești
Armășești
Axintele
Balaciu
Bărcănești
Bărbulești
Borănești
Bordușani
Bucu
Buești
Ciocârlia
Ciochina
Ciulnița
Cocora
Colelia
Cosâmbești
Coșereni
Drăgoești
Dridu
Făcăeni
Gârbovi
Gheorghe Doja
Gheorghe Lazăr
Giurgeni
Grindu
Grivița
Gura Ialomiței
Ion Roată
Jilavele
Maia
Manasia
Mărculești
Mihail Kogălniceanu
Miloșești
Moldoveni
Movila
Movilița
Munteni-Buzău 
Ograda
Perieți
Platonești
Rădulești
Reviga
Roșiori
Sălcioara
Sărățeni
Săveni
Scânteia
Sfântu Gheorghe
Sinești
Stelnica
Sudiți
Traian
Valea Ciorii
Valea Măcrișului
Vlădeni

Historical county

Historically, the county was located in the southeastern part of Greater Romania, in the southeastern part of the historical region of Muntenia. The county comprised a large part of the current Ialomița County and of today's Călărași County. It was bordered to the west by Ilfov County, to the north by the counties of Prahova, Buzău and Brăila, to the east by Constanța County, and in the south by Durostor County.

Administration

The county was originally divided administratively into five districts (plăși):
Plasa Călărași, headquartered at Călărași
Plasa Lehliu, headquartered at Lehliu
Plasa Slobozia, headquartered at Slobozia
Plasa Țăndărei, headquartered at Țăndărei
Plasa Urziceni, headquartered at Urziceni

Subsequently, three new districts were added:Plasa Căzănești, headquartered at Căzănești
Plasa Dragoș Vodă, headquartered at Dragoș Vodă
Plasa Fetești, headquartered at Fetești

Population 
According to the 1930 census data, the county population was 293,352 inhabitants, ethnically divided as follows: 96.6% Romanians, 2.5% Romanies, 0.2% Jews, as well as other minorities. From the religious point of view, the population was 99.3% Eastern Orthodox, 0.2% Jewish, 0.1% Roman Catholic, as well as other minorities.

Urban population 
In 1930, the county's urban population was 34,260 inhabitants, comprising 90.2% Romanians, 6.0% Romnanies, 1.3% Jews, as well as other minorities. From the religious point of view, the urban population was composed of 97.4% Eastern Orthodox, 1.4% Jewish, 0.5% Roman Catholic, as well as other minorities.

References

 
Counties of Romania
Place names of Slavic origin in Romania
1879 establishments in Romania
1938 disestablishments in Romania
1940 establishments in Romania
1950 disestablishments in Romania
1968 establishments in Romania
States and territories established in 1879
States and territories disestablished in 1938
States and territories established in 1940
States and territories disestablished in 1950
States and territories established in 1968